Richard Corsie MBE (born 27 November 1966) is a Scottish international outdoor and indoor bowls player, he is considered to be among the best bowls players of all time.

Bowls career
Corsie won the World Indoor Bowls Championships singles title three times during his career and also won the pairs title twice with Alex Marshall and Graham Robertson respectively.

He won the pairs title at the 1992 World Outdoor Bowls Championship with Marshall and two years later won a Commonwealth Games gold medal in the singles at the 1994 Commonwealth Games beating his long-time nemesis and friend Tony Allcock in the final.

In 1987, he won the Hong Kong International Bowls Classic singles title, in addition to winning the pairs titles in 1988.

He was the Chairman of the Professional Bowls Association when the World Bowls Tour was formed on 1 January 1997.

Awards
Corsie was appointed Member of the Order of the British Empire (MBE) in the 1999 New Year Honours for services to bowls.

He was inducted into the Scottish Sports Hall of Fame in March 2010.

References

1966 births
Living people
Scottish male bowls players
Bowls World Champions
Bowls players at the 1986 Commonwealth Games
Bowls players at the 1990 Commonwealth Games
Bowls players at the 1994 Commonwealth Games
Commonwealth Games gold medallists for Scotland
Commonwealth Games bronze medallists for Scotland
Commonwealth Games medallists in lawn bowls
Indoor Bowls World Champions
Members of the Order of the British Empire
Medallists at the 1986 Commonwealth Games
Medallists at the 1990 Commonwealth Games
Medallists at the 1994 Commonwealth Games